Guillermo Jaime Jorrín (born November 12, 1969), known as Willie Jorrín, is a Mexican-American former professional boxer who competed from 1993 to 2003. He held the WBC super bantamweight title from 2000 to 2002. Jorrín was trained by five-time Trainer of the Year Freddie Roach.

Amateur career
Jorrín holds an amateur win over Wayne McCullough in McCullough's home country of Northern Ireland.

Professional career
Willie made his professional debut on February 12, 1993, with a first round knockout victory over Esau Diegues. This was the first of three consecutive first round knockout victories for Jorrín. On October 1 of that year, Pat Chávez became the first person to go the distance with Jorrín, losing a six-round decision to the Sacramento fighter.

He faced Enrique Jupiter on June 7, 1997. Jupiter was a ranked contender and Jorrín beat him by a ten round unanimous decision. Jorrín then became a ranked challenger by the WBC. Jorrin outpointed Juan Luis Torres, also over ten rounds, on December 4, 1997.

Jorrín won all three of his fights in 1998, including a four round knockout over Enrique Valenzuela. He kept his winning ways in 1999, winning three fights, among them, a twelve round decision over Aristead Clayton and a five round knockout over Juan Luis Torres in a rematch. After those wins, he was ranked as the world's number one contender by the WBC.

WBC Super Bantamweight Championship
In September 2000, Jorrín took on the road, going to Manchester,  England, where he became world champion by beating Michael Brodie on September 9 with a majority decision for the WBC's world Super Bantamweight title, the same belt that Wilfredo Gómez and Lupe Pintor, among others, had had before Jorrín.

For his first defense, he won over Óscar Larios by decision in twelve back home in Sacramento on an ESPN televised fight on January 19, 2001. He then went to Japan, where he dropped Osamu Sato in round three of his second defense, but was only given a draw (tie) by the judges on February 5, 2002. Then Willie lost to Larios in a rematch, Jorrín lost his WBC's world title.

Jorrín started a quest to try to recover his world title almost immediately, and on April 25, 2003, he beat John Hoffman by a knockout in two rounds at Rosemont, Illinois. In his next fight, on November 6 at Phoenix, however, he suffered a setback, losing by unanimous decision in ten rounds to Christen Favela.

See also
List of Mexican boxing world champions
List of super bantamweight boxing champions
List of WBC world champions

References

External links
Willie Jorrín on Myspace

Living people
1969 births
American male boxers
Super-bantamweight boxers
World Boxing Council champions
World super-bantamweight boxing champions
American boxers of Mexican descent
Boxers from Sacramento, California